Selenge is a geographic name in Mongolia:
 Selenge River in Mongolia (Selenga in Russia)
 Selenge Province, an Aimag of Mongolia
 Selenge, Bulgan, a Sum (district) in the Bulgan aimag